Degerlund may refer to:

Marcus Degerlund (born 1998), Swedish footballer
Paul Degerlund (born 1948), Swedish Army major general
Rolf Degerlund (born 1952), Swedish actor

Swedish-language surnames